The Duchy of Milan was a state in northern Italy, created in 1395 by Gian Galeazzo Visconti, then the lord of Milan, and a member of the important Visconti family, which had been ruling the city since 1277. 

At that time, it included twenty-six towns and the wide rural area of the middle Padan Plain east of the hills of Montferrat. During much of its existence, it was wedged between Savoy to the west, Venice to the east, the Swiss Confederacy to the north, and separated from the Mediterranean by Genoa to the south. The duchy was at its largest at the beginning of the 15th century, at which time it included almost all of what is now Lombardy and parts of what are now Piedmont, Veneto, Tuscany and Emilia-Romagna.

Under the House of Sforza, Milan experienced a period of great prosperity with the introduction of the silk industry, becoming one of the wealthiest states during the Renaissance.

From the late 15th century, the Duchy of Milan was contested between the forces of the Holy Roman Empire and the Kingdom of France. It was ruled by Habsburg Spain from 1556 and it passed to Habsburg Austria in 1707 during the War of the Spanish Succession as a vacant Imperial fief. The duchy remained an Austrian possession until 1796 when a French army under Napoleon Bonaparte conquered it, and it ceased to exist a year later as a result of the Treaty of Campo Formio, when Austria ceded it to the new Cisalpine Republic.

After the defeat of Napoleon, the Congress of Vienna of 1815 restored many other states which he had destroyed, but not the Duchy of Milan. Instead, its former territory became part of the Kingdom of Lombardy–Venetia, with the Emperor of Austria as its king. In 1859, Lombardy was ceded to the Kingdom of Piedmont-Sardinia, which became the Kingdom of Italy in 1861.

History

The House of Visconti had ruled Milan since 1277, in which year Ottone Visconti defeated Napoleone della Torre.
The Duchy of Milan (Ducatus Mediolani) was created as a state of the Holy Roman Empire on 1 May 1395, when Gian Galeazzo Visconti purchased a diploma for 100,000 Florins from King Wenceslaus. It was this diploma that installed Visconti as Duke of Milan and Count of Pavia.

Visconti rule (1395–1447) 

The duchy, as defined in the diploma of 1395, included the territory surrounding Milan, between the Adda and Ticino rivers, but the dominions of Gian Galeazzo Visconti extended beyond, including 26 towns and spanned from Piedmont to Veneto and from present-day Canton of Ticino to Umbria. Milan thus became one of the five major states of the Italian peninsula in the 15th century. The House of Visconti had been expanding their dominions for nearly a century, under the reigns of Azzone Visconti, Luchino Visconti, Giovanni Visconti, Bernabò Visconti and Gian Galeazzo Visconti: during the rule of Azzone Visconti, the Ossola in Piedmont had been conquered in 1331, followed by Bergamo and Pavia (Lombardy) and Novara (Piedmont) in 1332, Pontremoli (Tuscany) in 1333, Vercelli (Piedmont) and Cremona (Lombardy) in 1334, the Lombard cities of Como, Crema, Lodi and the Valtellina in 1335, Bormio (Lombardy) and Piacenza (Emilia) in 1336, and Brescia and the Val Camonica in 1337. 

The brothers Luchino and Giovanni Visconti added Bellinzona (present-day Switzerland in 1342, Parma (Emilia) in 1346 and several territories in southwestern Piedmont in 1347: Tortona, Alessandria, Asti, and Mondovì. Bernabò conquered Reggio Emilia in 1371 and Riva del Garda in 1380, and Gian Galeazzo greatly expanded Milan's dominions, first eastwards, with the conquest of the Venetian cities of Verona (1387), Vicenza (1387), Feltre (1388), Belluno (1388) and Padua (briefly, from 1388 to 1390), and later southwards, conquering Lucca, Pisa and Siena in Tuscany in 1399, Bologna in Emilia in 1402, and Perugia and Assisi in Umbria also in 1402.

Ambrosian Republic (1447–1450) 

When the last Visconti duke, Filippo Maria, died in 1447 without a male heir, the Milanese declared the so-called Golden Ambrosian Republic, which soon faced revolts and attacks from its neighbors. In 1450 mercenary captain Francesco Sforza, having previously married Filippo Maria Visconti's illegitimate daughter Bianca Maria, conquered the city and restored the duchy, founding the House of Sforza.

Sforza rule (1450–1499) 

Whilst ruled by the Visconti and Sforza, the duchy had to defend its territory against the Swiss, the French and the Venetians, until Ludovico Sforza was handed over to the French in the 'Betrayal of Novara' in April 1500, thus enabling the new French king Louis XII to successfully assert his claim to the duchy.

French rule (1499–1526) 
In 1498, Louis XII ascended the French throne, and immediately sought to make good his father's claim to Milan. He invaded in 1499 and soon ousted Lodovico Sforza. The French ruled the duchy until 1512, when they were ousted by the Swiss, who put Lodovico's son Massimiliano on the throne. Massimiliano's reign did not last very long. The French, now under Francis I, invaded the area in 1515 and reasserted their control at the Battle of Marignano. The French took Massimiliano as their prisoner. The French were again driven out in 1521, this time by the Austrians, who installed Massimiliano's younger brother, Francesco II Sforza.

Following the French defeat at Pavia in 1525, which left the armies of Emperor Charles V dominant in Italy, Francesco joined the League of Cognac against the emperor along with Venice, Florence, Pope Clement VII, and the French. This resulted quickly in his own expulsion from Milan by imperial forces, but he managed to remain in control of various other cities in the duchy, and was again restored to Milan itself by the peace concluded at Cambrai in 1529.

In 1535, Francesco died without heirs and the question of succession again arose, with both the emperor and the French king claiming the duchy, leading to more wars. The Duchy of Parma was created in 1545 from a part of the Duchy of Milan south of the Po River, as a fief for Pope Paul III's illegitimate son, Pier Luigi Farnese, centered on the city of Parma.

Spanish Habsburg rule (1556–1707) 
Emperor Charles V held the duchy from 1535, eventually granting it to his son King Philip II of Spain from 1556. The possession of the duchy by Habsburg Spain was finally recognized by the French in the Treaty of Cateau-Cambrésis in 1559.

The Duchy of Milan remained in Habsburg Spain hands until the War of the Spanish Succession (1701–1714), when the Austrians invaded it (1701) and obtained it with the Convention of Milan in 1707.

Austrian Habsburg rule (1714–1796) 
The duchy remained in Austrian hands until it was overrun by the French army of Napoleon Bonaparte in 1796. The duchy was ceded by Austria in the Treaty of Campo Formio in 1797, and formed the central part of the new Cisalpine Republic.

Military 
Under the Spanish viceroys from 1535, Milan became one of the contributors to the Spanish king's army. At the time Lombardy had the most developed manufacturing and commercial economy anywhere in the world, making it a valuable tool for the Spanish military: an armory of paramount strategic importance.Gregory Hanlon. "The Twilight Of A Military Tradition: Italian Aristocrats And European Conflicts, 1560–1800." Routledge: 1997. Page 54. In addition to resources, Milan also provided soldiers. During the 1635–1659 Franco-Spanish War, Milan sent and paid for on average 4,000 soldiers per year to the Spanish crown, with many of these men serving in the Low Countries against the Dutch States Army.Gregory Hanlon. "The Hero of Italy: Odoardo Farnese, Duke of Parma, his Soldiers, and his Subjects in the Thirty Years' War." Routledge: May 2014. Page 116-117.

Legacy 
After the defeat of Napoleon, based on the decisions of the Congress of Vienna on 9 June 1815, the Duchy of Milan was not restored. The duchy instead became part of the Kingdom of Lombardy–Venetia, a constituent of the Austrian Empire and with the Emperor of Austria as its king. This kingdom ceased to exist when the remaining portion of it was annexed to the Kingdom of Italy in 1866.

Historical coat of arms

See also 
 List of rulers of Milan
 List of Governors of the Duchy of Milan
 House of Sforza
 Insubria

References

Sources

External links
 About Milan

 
1796 disestablishments in Italy
States and territories established in 1395
Duchy of Milan
House of Visconti
House of Sforza

Italian city-states
Italian states
1395 establishments in Europe
Christian states
Former monarchies of Europe
Former duchies